Stramnica  is a village in the administrative district of Gmina Kołobrzeg, within Kołobrzeg County, West Pomeranian Voivodeship, in north-western Poland.

For the history of the region, see History of Pomerania.

The village has a population of 210.

Buildings and structures 
At Stramnica, there is at  a 106 metres tall lattice tower operated by Rstv and used for FM-/TV-broadcasting .
Close to this tower, there is at  a second smaller telecommunication tower, which is also a lattice tower and approximately 83 metres tall.

References

Stramnica